Tyrell Johnson is the name of:

Tyrell Johnson (American football) (born 1985), American football player
Tyrell Johnson (cricketer) (1917–1985), West Indian cricketer